The 52nd Street station was a station on the demolished section of the BMT Fifth Avenue Line in Brooklyn, New York City. It was served by trains of the BMT Fifth Avenue Line, it had 2 tracks and 1 island platform. The station was opened on October 1, 1893, at the intersection of Third Avenue and 52nd Street. The next stop to the north was 46th Street. The next stop to the south was 58th Street. It closed on May 31, 1940. Current rapid transit service in this area can be found one block east and then another block south at the 53rd Street station on the underground BMT Fourth Avenue Line.

References

External links
 Fifth Avenue El

BMT Fifth Avenue Line stations
Railway stations in the United States opened in 1893
Railway stations closed in 1940
Former elevated and subway stations in Brooklyn
Sunset Park, Brooklyn